Rhagionidae or snipe flies are a small family of flies.
They get their name from the similarity of their often prominent proboscis that looks like the beak of a snipe.

Description
Rhagionidae are medium-sized to large flies with slender bodies and stilt-like legs. The mouthparts are adapted for piercing and many species are haematophagous as adults, while others are predatory on other insects. They are typically brown and yellow flies, and lack bristles. The larvae are also predatory and are mostly terrestrial, although some are aquatic.

Snipe flies in the genus Rhagio are sometimes called "down-looker" flies after their habit of perching head-downward on tree trunks.

Classification

The family is contained in Brachycera infraorder Tabanomorpha, and several of its constituent groups have been recently elevated to family rank. Atherix (and related genera) now comprise the Athericidae, Vermileo (and related genera) now comprise the Vermileonidae, and the genera Austroleptis and Bolbomyia are each now the sole members of their own families (Austroleptidae and Bolbomyiidae).

List of subfamilies and genera
Arthrocerinae Williston, 1886
Arthroceras Williston, 1886 - Nearctic, Palearctic
Chrysopilinae Bezzi, 1903
Chrysopilus Macquart, 1826 - Nearctic, Palearctic, Afrotropic, Neotropic, Oriental
Schizella Bezzi, 1926 - Philippines
Stylospania Frey, 1954 - Philippines
Rhagioninae Latreille, 1802
Arthroteles Bezzi, 1926 - Afrotropic
Atherimorpha White, 1914 - Australasia, Neotropic, Afrotropic
Desmomyia Brunetti, 1912 -  Palearctic, Oriental
Rhagio Fabricius, 1775 - Nearctic, Palearctic
Sierramyia Kerr, 2010  - Nearctic/Neotropic
Spaniinae Frey, 1954
Litoleptis Chillcott, 1963 - Nearctic, Oriental, Neotropic
Omphalophora Becker, 1900 -  Palearctic, Nearctic
Palaeoarthroteles Kovalev & Mostovski, 1997
Ptiolina Staeger in Zetterstedt, 1842 - Nearctic, Palearctic
Spania  Meigen, 1830 - Nearctic, Palearctic
Spaniopsis White, 1914 - Australasia
Symphoromyia Frauenfeld, 1867 - Nearctic, Palearctic
Incertae sedis
Alloleptis Nagatomi & Saigusa in Nagatomi, 1982 - Sulawesi

See also
 Use of DNA in forensic entomology

Further reading
 Bezzi, M. 1928. Diptera Brachycera and Athericera of the Fiji Islands based on material in the British Museum (Natural History). British Museum (Natural History), London. viii + 220 pp.
 Lindner, E 1924–1925. Rhagionidae in Die Fliegen der Paläarktischen Region 4 (20) 1–49.   Keys to genera and species.
 Stuckenberg, B., 1960. Diptera (Brachycera): Rhagionidae. S.Afr. anim. Life 7: 216–308 Keys to genera and species.
 Stuckenberg, B., 1965. The Rhagionidae of Madagascar (Diptera). Ann.Natal Mus. 18:89–170. Keys to genera and species.
 Leonard, M. D., 1930. A revision of the Dipterous family Rhagionidae (Leptidae) in the United States and Canada, Memoirs of the American Entomological Society 7:1–181.
 Malloch, J. R., 1932. Rhagionidae, Therevidae. British Museum (Natural History). Dept. of Entomology [eds] Diptera of Patagonia and South Chile, based mainly on material in the British Museum (Natural History). Part V. Fascicle 3. - Rhagionidae (Leptidae), Therevidae, Scenopinidae, Mydaidae, Asilidae, Lonchopteridae. pp. 199–293.
 Nagatomi, A. & Soroida, K., 1985. The structure of the mouthparts of the orthorrhaphous Brachycera (Diptera) with special reference to blood-sucking. Beitr. Ent. 35 (2): 263–368, 480.

References

External links

Rhagio mystaceus Rhagio diagnostic photographs

 
Brachycera families
Taxa named by Pierre André Latreille